Village Capital is a venture capital firm that finds, trains, and invests in early-stage ventures solving major global problems in agriculture, education, energy, financial inclusion, and health. VilCap Investments, LLC is its affiliated, managed investment fund. The programs use a model referred to as peer-selection, in which the entrepreneurs themselves choose the companies in the program that receive pre-committed investments of around $50,000. As of October 2018, Village Capital reported that they had made over 100 investments, and that over 900 entrepreneurs had gone through a total of more than 50 programs.

History 
CEO Ross Baird and early board member Bob Pattillo developed the concept in 2009 as an initiative of First Light Ventures. According to Baird, the concept drew inspiration from the "village bank" concept in microfinance, where peer groups of women in developing countries would enable small loans through a peer-review structure. Businessweek described their first programs in the US and India as "if Microfinance and Angel Investing had a baby."

In 2011, Village Capital launched as an independent organization with founding support from foundations active in impact investing: the DOEN Foundation, the Rockefeller Foundation, and the Monterey Institute of International Studies. In 2014 the U.S. Agency for International Development Global Development Lab awarded Village Capital a five-year grant to offset the fund’s operating costs.

In 2016, Village Capital closed an $18 million fund from a group including AOL co-founder Steve Case.

Program 

The organization's investment readiness programs are what the founders call "problem-based", focusing on a specific social problem, and recruiting businesses targeted to solve this problem. For example, a 2018 health program supported early-stage companies solving critical issues for an aging population.

Village Capital programs generally consist of three four-day workshops over a three-month period. In the sessions, ventures develop their business models, learn to create and manage a team, interact with potential customers, and connect with investors, all while participating in peer-mentoring with an eye toward the ultimate peer-rank and investment. One of the principles of the curriculum is the 'Lens of the Investor' whereby entrepreneurs are put in the role of investors in order to learn to see themselves from that perspective. The programs are typically in operation with local partners with sector or geographic expertise.

Results 

A 2016 report by the Global Accelerator Learning Initiative found that participants in a Village Capital program earned follow-on investment at a rate eight times that of entrepreneurs who were not accepted for a program. The peer-selection model has also been shown to result in increased access capital for female entrepreneurs; companies with female co-founders are 78% more likely to be selected than male-only companies, three times the likelihood that women entrepreneurs will receive funding through traditional venture capital.

Village Capital CEO Ross Baird won the Harvard Business Review/Mckinsey M-Prize for Management Innovation in 2013 for the innovation of peer-selected investment.

In 2018, Village Capital was ranked as one of the "most connected" organizations in impact investing according to the Aspen Institute.

References 

Social finance
Social entrepreneurship
Business incubators of the United States
Organizations established in 2009